Édouard is both a French given name and a surname, equivalent to Edward in English. Notable people with the name include:

 Édouard Balladur (born 1929), French politician
 Édouard Boubat (1923–1999), French photographer
 Édouard Colonne (1838–1910), French conductor
 Édouard Daladier (1884–1970), French prime minister at the start of World War II
 Edouard Drumont (1844–1917), French anti-semitic journalist
 Édouard Dujardin (1861–1949), French writer
 Édouard Gagnon (1918–2007), French Canadian cardinal
 Édouard Herriot (1872–1957), French prime minister, three times, and mayor of Lyon from 1905 to 1957 
 Edouard F. Henriques, Make-up artist
 Édouard Lalo (1823–1892), French composer
 Édouard Lockroy (1838–1913), French politician
 Édouard Louis (born 1992), French Writer
 Édouard Lucas (1842–1891), French mathematician
 Édouard Mathé (1886–1934), French silent film actor
 Édouard Manet (1832–1883), French impressionist painter
 Édouard de Max (1869–1924), Romanian-French actor
 Édouard Mendy (born 1992), Senegalese footballer
 Édouard Ménétries (1802–1861), French entomologist
 Édouard Michelin (1859–1940), French tyre magnate
 Édouard Philippe (born 1970), French politician
 Édouard Spach (1801–1879), French botanist
 Édouard Stephan (1837–1923), French astronomer
 Édouard Toudouze (1848-1907), French painter
 Édouard Vuillard (1868–1940), French painter

Surname:
 $not, (born 1997 as Edy Edouard), American rapper
 Odsonne Édouard (born 1998), French footballer
 Romain Édouard (born 1990), French chess player

Fictional characters:
 Édouard a novel by Claire de Duras published in 1825

See also
 Hurricane Edouard (disambiguation)
Édouard André (disambiguation)
 
Edward
Eduardo

French-language surnames
French masculine given names